Henrietta Katherine Harrison,  (born 1967) is a British historian, sinologist, and academic.

Education and career
Henrietta Harrison was educated at St Paul's Girls' School, Hammersmith, Newnham College, Cambridge (BA 1989), Harvard University (MA 1992) and St Antony's College, Oxford (DPhil 1996). She was formerly a junior research fellow at St Anne's College, Oxford (1996–1998), a lecturer in Chinese at the University of Leeds (1999–2006), and a professor of history at Harvard University (2006–2012). Since 2012, she has been Professor of Modern Chinese Studies at the University of Oxford. She has also been a Fellow of Pembroke College, Oxford since 2015, and was previously a Fellow of St Cross College, Oxford (2012–2015).

Harrison works mainly on the social and cultural history of China from the Qing through to the present, especially rural north China, links between transnational and local history, religion, diplomacy and revolution.

Honours and recognition
In 2014, Harrison was elected a Fellow of the British Academy (FBA), the United Kingdom's national academy for the humanities and social sciences.

Her most recent book, The Perils of Interpreting, won the 2022 Kenshur Prize for best book in Eighteenth-Century Studies, and was shortlisted for the 2022 Cundill Prize.

Selected works

References

1967 births
Living people
21st-century British historians
Alumni of Newnham College, Cambridge
British women historians
British sinologists
Fellows of Pembroke College, Oxford
Fellows of St Cross College, Oxford
Harvard University faculty
Academics of the University of Leeds
Fellows of the British Academy
Historians of China
21st-century British women writers
Women orientalists
Harvard University alumni